Yasny is a town in Orenburg Oblast, Russia, located  southeast of Orenburg, the administrative center of the oblast. Population:

History
It was founded in 1961, granted urban-type settlement status in 1962, and town status in 1979.

Administrative and municipal status
Within the framework of administrative divisions, Yasny serves as the administrative center of Yasnensky District, even though it is not a part of it. As an administrative division, it is incorporated separately as the Town of Yasny—an administrative unit with the status equal to that of the districts. As a municipal division, the territories of the Town of Yasny and of Yasnensky District are incorporated as Yasnensky Urban Okrug.

Space industry
The Dombarovsky Cosmodrome, located near Yasny, is a rocket launch site. Launches from Dombarovsky include orbital Dnepr launches, for ISC Kosmotras.

References

Notes

Sources

External links
Unofficial website of Yasny 

Cities and towns in Orenburg Oblast